Mark Alan Jones (born 15 August 1984) is a retired Welsh footballer.

Club career

Wrexham

He joined Wrexham as a trainee on 1 August 2002. He made his debut on 17 September 2002 in a 4–0 win over Exeter City, but only became an established player two seasons later. He has become particularly popular at the club as one of the most talented local players, and as a scorer of some spectacular long-range goals. Despite being a midfielder, he was one of the club's most regular goalscorers, with a ratio of 0.2 goals per game as of the end of the 2005–06 season.

Following Wrexham's relegation from League Two, Jones, who had already declared his intention to leave the club, was released at the end of the 2007–08 season.

Rochdale
After a successful trial at the club, Rochdale announced on 15 August 2008 that they were seeking international clearance to complete the signing of Jones. On 14 May 2009, it was announced that Mark Jones would leave Rochdale, along with 10 other players, after making 13 appearances for the club in all competitions.

Return to Wrexham
In June 2009, Jones returned to Wrexham, signing a one-year deal. Placed straight into the first-team on his return, Jones scored his first goal since moving back to Wrexham in a 3–0 win over Luton Town on 22 September. At the end of the year, Jones was released by Wrexham for a second time.

Bala Town
Following his release from Wrexham, Jones signed for Welsh Premier League side Bala Town. In doing so he rejected offers from other Conference National sides in order not to move away from his home and also in the hope of enjoying playing football again, stating "I'm not enjoying playing football full-time at all and have not for a few years.[...] I began playing football as a youngster for the love of it, not for money, and I want to feel that way about football again."

Airbus UK Broughton
Jones left Bala in 2017, joining Airbus UK Broughton. In his first season, he made twelve league appearances, scoring once.

International career

As well as making several appearances for Wales under-21s, he has been called up to the senior Wales squad on two occasions. He made his international debut in a friendly against Liechtenstein on 14 November 2006.

Jones was named in the Wales squad ahead of more experienced players, such as Robert Earnshaw, for games against Iceland and the Netherlands in the summer of 2008.

Statistics

Honours
Wrexham
Football League Trophy: 2004–05

Individual
PFA Team of the Year: 2005–06 Football League Two
Welsh Premier League Player of the Season: 2011–12
Welsh Premier League Team of the Year: 2010–11, 2011–12, 2012–13

References

External links

Footballer Player Profiles

1984 births
Living people
Welsh footballers
Wrexham A.F.C. players
Rochdale A.F.C. players
Wales international footballers
Wales under-21 international footballers
English Football League players
National League (English football) players
Bala Town F.C. players
Airbus UK Broughton F.C. players
Cymru Premier players
Association football midfielders
Cymru Alliance players